European Sports NGO Youth (ENGSO Youth) is the non-governmental umbrella youth organisation of ENGSO (European Non-Governmental Sports Organisation). It has the aim to represent the young Europeans in sports in 34 countries and to achieve, promote and support the implementation of the ENGSO guidelines for children and youth sport. ENGSO Youth promotes health, sustainable development, sport diplomacy, education and employability, and inclusion through sports. ENGSO Youth is member of the European Youth Forum since 2007.

History
At the beginning of 2000, on initiative of the German Sports Youth (Deutsche Sportjugend), eight national sport umbrella organisations from eight European countries started to co-operate in the "Network for the European Youth Work in Sports – Sport Youth goes Europe“. These partners have joined forces on European level to engage and lobby for the interests of young people that are organised in sport clubs and federations.

Vision, mission and aims
According to the official website, ENGSO Youth is driven by the following strategic principles:

Organisation

ENGSO Youth operates by relying on advocacy, projects, policy and networking, with special focus on: 
 Sustainable development in and through sport;
 Inclusion in and through sport;
 Health enhancing physical activity;
 Education and employability in and through sport;
 Sports diplomacy;
 Internal development and nourishing cooperation with ENGSO and its organisational bodies.

Aims
 To be the youth sport organisation in Europe and offer a platform for individuals, organisations, stakeholders and policy makers to connect, debate and collaborate Europe-wide;
 To continue involving a growing number of young Europeans, especially those with fewer opportunities, and organisations in sport and in the decision-making process of sport's policies;
 To develop ENGSO Youth capacities in more regions of Europe;
 To foster cross-sector cooperation, in order to engage a broader network of partners when tackling European, national and local youth issues;
 To develop projects with long-lasting, multiplying and self-perpetuating effects on current themes in the youth sector to leave a lasting legacy.

Structure

ENGSO Youth is structured with a Youth Assembly as the highest decision making body. The Youth Assembly meets annually and decides about statutes, the political platform and the work plan, as well as it elects the Committee of ENGSO Youth. The Committee is elected every 2 years. The Committee consists of 9 members and is responsible for leading and representing the organisation between the Youth Assemblies.
The Committee and the Secretariat coordinate the daily work of the organisation.

ENGSO Youth has a secretariat based in Vilnius (Lithuania). ENGSO Youth also has three full time staff members: secretariat, projects and policy manager and communications officer. Additional part-time staff members are responsible for the project management.

Chairperson

Committee Members
Each committee is elected by the entire membership every 2 years at the Youth Assembly, it consists of:
 the Chair
 the Vice-Chair
 7 Committee Members

Committee Members: Mandate 2021-2023

Committee Members: Mandate 2019-2021

Committee Members: Mandate 2017-2019

Committee Members: Mandate 2015-2017

Committee Members: Mandate 2013-2015

Committee Members: Mandate 2011-2013

Committee Members: Mandate 2009-2011

Staff

Secretariat

Working Groups

ENGSO Youth recognizes the importance of the UN Sustainable Development Goals and is committed to contributing to their fulfillment. At the same time, we remain determined to use sport as a tool in their achievement, while narrowing our focus to youth in the grassroots sport sector. Therefore, the following UN Sustainable Development Goals have been selected as our primary long term focus.

Activities and projects
ENGSO Youth has realised several project all using physical activity and sport as a tool for a social change. All project have been realized thanks to grants by the European Union or the Council of Europe. In particular through the Youth in Action Program (Youth Unit, DG Education and Culture), Preparatory Actions in the Field of Sport (Sport Unit, DG Education and Culture) and the Youth Department grants of the Council of Europe.
ENGSO Youth is cooperating with several European and International Organisations with which shares objectives and aims.
More in detail is a partner of the Enlarged Partial Agreement on Sport (EPAS) of the Council of Europe. ENGSO Youth has signed a Memorandum of Understanding with the European Paralympic Committee
ENGSO Youth is tightly cooperating on several project with the European University Sports Association - EUSA.
A mutual and constant cooperation is also active with the European Gay and Lesbian Sport Federation - EGLSF since 2012. ENGSO Youth is the creator of the campaign Youth Sport speaks out on TabooPhobia - Developing a youth led campaign to challenge homophobia in and through sport  and cooperated in a European funded project (DAPHNE III) against sexual and gender harassment and abuse in sports, Sport Respect Your Rights.

In the mandates of 2015-2019 ENGSO Youth participated in several Erasmus+ funded projects in various areas of sport, inclusion, employment, sexual violence and other: Sport empowers disabled youth (SEDY), Study on the Contribution of Sport to the Employability of Young People in the Context of the Europe 2020 Strategy, Voices for Truth and Dignity, Activity, Sport and Play for the Inclusion of Refugees in Europe – ASPIRE and RISE - Refugees Integration through Sport.

In 2018 ENGSO You signed a memorandum of understanding with Special Olympics Europe Eurasia.

Currently ENGSO Youth leads the SK4YS - Skills for You(th) through Sport project and participates as a partner organisation in: COME IN! - inclusive sports programmes for young people with and without disabilities, SWinG - Supporting Women in achieving their Goals, EYVOL - Empowering Youth Volunteers through Sport and MONITOR - Monitoring and Evaluation Manual for Sport-for-Employability Programmes.

Publications
 Roland Naul and Jan Holze. Sports development and young people: The role of international organizations. Routledge Handbook of Sports Development, Routledge International Handbooks, Editors Barrie Houlihan, Mick Green, Publisher Routledge, 2010, pp. 198–212

References

External links

 ENGSO Youth Official Website
 Council of Europe Enlarged Partial Agreement on Sport - EPAS
 Council of Europe Youth Department
 European Paralympic Committee - EPC
 European Youth Forum - YFJ
 European University Sports Association - EUSA
 International University Sports Federation - FISU
 European Gay and Lesbian Sport Federation - EGLSF

{{
 |url= https://www.youth-sport.net/about
 |title= ENGSO Youth's Strategy 2020-2023
 |author= ENGSO Youth
 |date= 28 February 2021
 |website= https://www.youth-sport.net/about
 |publisher= ENGSO Youth
 |access-date= 28 February 2021
}}
Sports organizations of Europe
Redirects from alternative spellings
International organizations based in Serbia
International non-profit organizations
Cross-European advocacy groups
Youth empowerment organizations